Petar Trbojević (born 9 September 1973 in Niš, Serbia, SFR Yugoslavia) is a retired Serbian water polo player who played on the bronze medal squad of FR Yugoslavia at the 2000 Summer Olympics and the silver medal squad of Serbia and Montenegro at the 2004 Summer Olympics.

Club career

Clubs he played for
 1990–1996 Partizan Belgrade
 1996–1999 NC Vouliagmeni
 1999–2001 Barceloneta
 2001–2004 Olympiacos
 2004–2009 Barceloneta
 – ASWP Pescara
 2009–2013 PVK Budvanska rivijera

Honours

Club
VK Partizan
 National Championship of Yugoslavia (1): 1994–95
 National Cup of Yugoslavia (5): 1990–91, 1991–92, 1992–93, 1993–94, 1994–95
 LEN Cup Winners' Cup (1): 1990–91
 LEN Super Cup (1): 1991
NC Vouliagmeni
 A1 Ethniki (2): 1996–97, 1997–98
 Greek Cup (1): 1998–99
 Greek Super Cup (1): 1996
 LEN Cup Winners' Cup (1): 1997
CN Atlètic-Barceloneta
 División de Honor (5): 2000–01, 2005–06, 2006–07, 2007–08, 2008–09
 Copa del Rey (6): 1999–2000, 2000–01, 2005–06, 2006–07, 2007–08, 2008–09
 Supercopa de España (5): 2001, 2006, 2007, 2008, 2009
 Copa de Cataluña (4): 2006, 2007, 2008, 2009
Olympiacos
 A1 Ethniki (3): 2001–02, 2002–03, 2003–04
 Greek Cup (3): 2001–02, 2002–03, 2003–04
 LEN Euroleague (1): 2001–02
 LEN Super Cup (1): 2002
PVK Budva
 Montenegrin First League (2): 2010–11, 2012–13
 Montenegrin Cup (1): 2010–11

See also
 List of Olympic medalists in water polo (men)
 List of world champions in men's water polo
 List of World Aquatics Championships medalists in water polo

References

 Serbian Olympic Committee 
 History of Super Cup winners in Spain 
 History of Copa del Ray winners in Spain

External links
 

1973 births
Living people
Serbian male water polo players
Serbia and Montenegro male water polo players
Yugoslav male water polo players
Olympiacos Water Polo Club players
Water polo players at the 1996 Summer Olympics
Water polo players at the 2000 Summer Olympics
Water polo players at the 2004 Summer Olympics
Olympic water polo players of Yugoslavia
Olympic water polo players of Serbia and Montenegro
Olympic bronze medalists for Federal Republic of Yugoslavia
Olympic silver medalists for Serbia and Montenegro
Sportspeople from Niš
Olympic medalists in water polo
World Aquatics Championships medalists in water polo
Medalists at the 2004 Summer Olympics
Medalists at the 2000 Summer Olympics
European champions for Serbia
Mediterranean Games gold medalists for Yugoslavia
Competitors at the 1997 Mediterranean Games
Mediterranean Games medalists in water polo
Universiade medalists in water polo
Universiade gold medalists for Serbia and Montenegro